The 1908–09 team finished with a record of 6–5. It was the sixth and final year for head coach Wilbur P. Bowen. The team captain was Frank Head. Earl Babcock was the team manager.

Roster

Schedule

|-
!colspan=9 style="background:#006633; color:#FFFFFF;"| Non-conference regular season

1. Media guide shows score of 68-23 and yearbook shows 67-23.

2. Both EMU & CMU list this game as a win.

References

Eastern Michigan Eagles men's basketball seasons
Michigan State Normal